Peter Braun (born 1 August 1962 in Tuttlingen) is a retired German middle-distance runner who specialised in the 800 metres. He won the gold medal at the 1986 European Indoor Championships. In addition, he competed at the 1988 Summer Olympics and 1987 World Championships.

International competitions

Personal bests
Outdoors
400 metres – 47.19 (Kevelaer 1986)
800 metres – 1:44.03 (Koblenz 1986)
1000 metres – 2:20.90 (Wattenscheid 1989)
1500 metres – 3:44.44 (Koblenz 1989)
Indoors
800 metres – 1:47.19 (Genoa 1992)

References

All-Athletics profile

1962 births
Living people
German male middle-distance runners
West German male middle-distance runners
Athletes (track and field) at the 1988 Summer Olympics
Olympic athletes of West Germany
People from Tuttlingen
Sportspeople from Freiburg (region)